In psychology, relationship obsessive–compulsive disorder (ROCD) is a form of obsessive–compulsive disorder focusing on close or intimate relationships. Such obsessions can become extremely distressing and debilitating, having negative impacts on relationships functioning.

Obsessive–compulsive disorder comprises thoughts, images or urges that are unwanted, distressing, interfere with a person's life and that are commonly experienced as contradicting a persons' beliefs and values. Such intrusive thoughts are frequently followed by compulsive behaviors aimed at "neutralizing" the feared consequence of the intrusions and temporarily relieve the anxiety caused by the obsessions. Attempts to suppress or "neutralize" obsessions increase rather than decrease the frequency and distress caused by the obsessions.

Common obsessive themes include fear of contamination, fears about being responsible for harming the self or others, doubts, and orderliness. However, people with OCD can also have religious and sexual obsessions. Some people with OCD may experience obsessions relating to the way they feel in an ongoing relationship or the way they felt in past relationships (ROCD). Repetitive thought about a person's feelings towards a relationship partner may occur in different relational contexts such as intimate or parent-child relationships; however, in ROCD such preoccupations are unwanted, intrusive, chronic and disabling.

Signs and symptoms

Relationship-centered symptoms
People may continuously doubt whether they love their partner, whether their relationship is the right relationship or whether their partner really loves them. When they know they love someone or that someone loves them, they constantly check and reassure themselves that it is the right feeling. When they attempt to end the relationship, they are overwhelmed with anxiety. By staying in the relationship, however, they are haunted by continuous doubts regarding the relationship.

Partner-focused symptoms
Another form of ROCD includes preoccupation, checking, and reassurance-seeking behaviors relating to the partner's perceived flaws. Instead of finding good in their partner, they are constantly focused on their shortcomings. They often exaggerate these flaws and use them to prove the relationship is fundamentally bad. The fact that they are unable to concentrate on anything but their partner's flaws causes the affected individual great anxiety, and often leads to a strained relationship. Recent investigations suggest partner-focused ROCD symptoms may also occur in the parent-child context. In such cases, parents may be overwhelmed by preoccupations that their child is not socially competent, good looking, moral or emotionally balanced enough. Such obsession are associated with increased parental stress and low mood.

Causes
Like other forms of OCD, psychological and biological factors are believed to play a role in the development and maintenance of ROCD. In addition to the maladaptive ways of thinking and behaving identified as important in OCD, models of ROCD suggest that over-reliance on intimate relationships or the perceived value of the partner for a person's feelings of self-worth and fear of abandonment (also see attachment theory) may increase vulnerability and maintain ROCD symptoms.

CBT Models of ROCD
ROCD is a form of OCD. Cognitive behavioral therapies (CBT) are considered the Gold Standard psychological treatments for OCD. According to CBT models, we all have unwanted, intrusive thoughts, images and urges. Individuals with OCD interpret these intrusive experiences as meaning something bad about their character (crazy or bad) or about the future (a catastrophe is going to occur). For instance, they may give the mere occurrence of an unwanted thought of a loved one having an accident the meaning that they wanted something bad to happen to them. Such interpretations increase attention to unwanted intrusive experiences, making them more distressing and increasing their frequency. Individuals with OCD try to control, neutralize or prevent intrusive experiences (or their content) from occurring using washing, checking, avoidance, suppression of thoughts or other mental and behavioral rituals (compulsions). These control attempts, however, paradoxically increase (rather than decrease) the occurrence of these unwanted intrusions and the distress associated with them. According to CBT models, individuals with OCD give such extremely negative interpretations to intrusive experiences because they hold maladaptive beliefs. For instance, the belief that if anything bad happens it is their own responsibility (inflated responsibility), can lead individuals with OCD to wash their hands repeatedly after having the thought "this may be contaminated." They will do this, in order to avoid feeling responsible for hurting someone else or themselves.

In ROCD, intrusions relating to the "rightness" of relationship or the suitability of the relationship partner (e.g., not smart, moral or good looking enough) are often the most distressing. In order to reduce the distress associated with such intrusions, individuals with ROCD often use various mental or behavioral strategies. For instance, they often try and get reassurance from others that the partner or the relationship is good enough, they may test the partner or check (from up close) their perceived flaw, they may look for information on the internet on "how do I know I'm in the right relationship" or assess their physical reaction and feelings towards their partner. These and similar behaviors, increase the attention given to the intrusion, give it more importance and make it more frequent. Individuals with ROCD also give catastrophic meaning to intrusions based on extreme maladaptive beliefs such as being in a relationship they are not absolutely sure about always leads to extreme disaster. Such beliefs lead individuals with ROCD to interpret common relationship doubts in a catastrophic way provoking compulsive mental acts and behaviors such as repeated checking of perceived flaws or repeated assessment of the strength and quality of one's feelings towards the partner.

Treatment of ROCD symptoms often involve psycho-education about the disorder and the CBT model, exposure and response prevention to feared thoughts or images and challenging of maladaptive relationship beliefs (e.g., believing that being in love means being happy all the time) and more common OCD beliefs such as perfectionism and intolerance of uncertainty. Recently, mobile applications have been developed to assist therapists challenge maladaptive beliefs associated with OCD and ROCD symptoms.

References

External links
 Relationship OCD Research Unit

Obsessive–compulsive disorder
Habit and impulse disorders
Stress-related disorders
Symptoms